The 2002–03 season was Fulham F.C.'s 105th season in professional football and second consecutive season in the FA Premier League. It was also the first season in over 115 years where Fulham did not play at Craven Cottage. Due to pending decisions on re-vamping the cottage, all home games (apart from two early-season fixtures) were played at Loftus Road, the home of Queens Park Rangers. Jean Tigana remained as Fulham manager up until his sacking in April 2003. Former Fulham player Chris Coleman had not long been retired from the game since suffering a career-ending injury in a car crash when he was appointed caretaker manager for the rest of the season.

Concerning the league, it was another relatively disappointing season for Fulham. Finishing in 14th place, it was seeming Fulham were finding top-flight football more of a struggle than was originally anticipated two years ago. However, an invitation to the Intertoto Cup after the 2001–02 campaign meant that Fulham could play European football for the first time in their history. Upon entering, Fulham went on to be one of the three winners of the competition, allowing them into the first round draw of the UEFA Cup. Performing better than most expected, Fulham reached the third round before being knocked out by German club Hertha BSC.

Players

First-team squad

Left club during season

Reserves and academy

Transfers

Summer

In

Out

Winter

Out

League table

Results

Premier League

League Cup

FA Cup

UEFA Intertoto Cup

UEFA Cup

Statistics

Appearances and goals

|-
! colspan=14 style=background:#dcdcdc; text-align:center| Goalkeepers

|-
! colspan=14 style=background:#dcdcdc; text-align:center| Defenders

|-
! colspan=14 style=background:#dcdcdc; text-align:center| Midfielders

|-
! colspan=14 style=background:#dcdcdc; text-align:center| Forwards

|-
! colspan=14 style=background:#dcdcdc; text-align:center| Players transferred out during the season

References

Notes

External links
Fulham's official website
Fulham on BBC Sport

Fulham F.C. seasons
Fulham